Łukasz Wiśniewski (born 3 February 1989) is a Polish professional volleyball player, a former member of the Poland national team, and the 2012 World League winner. At the professional club level, he plays for Jastrzębski Węgiel.

Personal life
Wiśniewski was born in Włodawa. His mother trained handball and his father is a former footballer. On 10 May 2014, Wiśniewski married Katarzyna (née Łuszczewska). On 2 January 2017, his wife gave birth to their daughter Aleksandra.

Career

National team
Wiśniewski made his debut in the Poland national team on 30 May 2010 in a friendly match against France. In December 2011, Poland, including Wiśniewski won a silver medal at the World Cup. He is also a gold medallist at the 2012 World League .

Honours

Clubs
 CEV Challenge Cup
  2011/2012 – with AZS Częstochowa
 National championships
 2012/2013  Polish Cup, with ZAKSA Kędzierzyn-Koźle
 2013/2014  Polish Cup, with ZAKSA Kędzierzyn-Koźle
 2015/2016  Polish Championship, with ZAKSA Kędzierzyn-Koźle
 2016/2017  Polish Cup, with ZAKSA Kędzierzyn-Koźle
 2016/2017  Polish Championship, with ZAKSA Kędzierzyn-Koźle
 2018/2019  Polish Cup, with ZAKSA Kędzierzyn-Koźle
 2018/2019  Polish Championship, with ZAKSA Kędzierzyn-Koźle
 2019/2020  Polish SuperCup, with Grupa Azoty ZAKSA Kędzierzyn-Koźle
 2020/2021  Polish Championship, with Jastrzębski Węgiel
 2021/2022  Polish SuperCup, with Jastrzębski Węgiel
 2022/2023  Polish SuperCup, with Jastrzębski Węgiel

Individual awards
 2013: Polish Cup – Best Blocker
 2014: Polish Cup – Best Blocker
 2016: Polish Cup – Best Server
 2017: Polish Cup – Best Blocker
 2019: Polish Cup – Best Blocker

References

External links

 
 Player profile at PlusLiga.pl 
 Player profile at Volleybox.net

1989 births
Living people
People from Włodawa
Sportspeople from Lublin Voivodeship
Polish men's volleyball players
AZS Częstochowa players
ZAKSA Kędzierzyn-Koźle players
Jastrzębski Węgiel players
Middle blockers